Radosław Kawęcki (born 16 August 1991) is a Polish competitive swimmer who specializes in backstroke events. Kawęcki won the silver medal in the 200 m backstroke at the 2013 and 2015 World Aquatics Championships, and was twice the 200 m backstroke short course world champion. He won four gold medals at the FINA World Swimming Championships in the 200 m backstroke. He is an 8-time European champion in the backstroke events. Kawęcki finished fourth at the 2012 Summer Olympics in London in the 200-meter backstroke.  He currently represents the Cali Condors which is part of the International Swimming League.

Career

World Championships 
A backstroke specialist, he won silver in the 200 m backstroke at the 2013 and 2015 World Championships.  In the short course World Championships, he has 3 golds (2012, 2014 and 2016) and 1 bronze (2018) in this event, as well as a silver medal in the 100 m backstroke from the 2014 World Short Course Championships.

European Championships 
At the European Long Course Swimming Championships, Kawęcki has also won 3 gold medals (2012, 2014 and 2016) in the 200 m backstroke, along with a silver medal in the event in 2018.

In the European Short Course Championships, Kawęcki has 6 gold medals in the 200 m backstroke (2011, 2012, 2013, 2015, 2019 and 2021) and 2 silver medals (2009, 2017), alongside 2 gold medals in the 100 m backstroke event (2011 and 2015).

International Swimming League
In 2019 he was a member of the inaugural International Swimming League representing the Cali Condors, who finished third place in the final match in Las Vegas, Nevada in December. Kawecki scored points in all 3 backstroke events as well as the medley relay for the Condors throughout the season.

References

External links

1991 births
Living people
Polish male freestyle swimmers
People from Głogów
Polish male backstroke swimmers
Olympic swimmers of Poland
Swimmers at the 2012 Summer Olympics
Swimmers at the 2016 Summer Olympics
Medalists at the FINA World Swimming Championships (25 m)
European Aquatics Championships medalists in swimming
Sportspeople from Lower Silesian Voivodeship
World Aquatics Championships medalists in swimming
Swimmers at the 2020 Summer Olympics
21st-century Polish people